The 2008–2009 Cyclo-cross Gazet van Antwerpen takes place between 1 November 2008 and 22 February 2009.

Men results

See also
 2008–2009 UCI Cyclo-cross World Cup
 2008–2009 Cyclo-cross Superprestige

External links
 Gazet van Antwerpen Trofee

Cyclo-cross BPost Bank Trophy
Gazet van Antwerpen
Gazet van Antwerpen